John Apea is a Ghanaian actor. In 2008 he won the Africa Movie Academy Award for Best Screenplay for the film Run Baby Run in which he also featured as the lead actor.

Run Baby Run received eight nominations and won four awards at the Africa Movie Academy Awards in 2008, including the awards for Best Picture, Best Director and Best Screenplay.

Career 
Apea studied at Achimota School and Sociology and Social Policy at the University of York and the University of Oxford. He is one of the lead actors in the popular Ghanaian television series Home Sweet Home. He is currently the newly appointed chief executive officer( CEO) of eTranzact Ghana, one of the  leading providers of mobile banking and payment services.

References

External links 
 

Living people
Ghanaian male film actors
21st-century Ghanaian male actors
Year of birth missing (living people)